Implant can refer to:

Medicine
Implant (medicine), or specifically:
Brain implant
Breast implant
Buttock implant
Cochlear implant
Contraceptive implant
Dental implant
Fetal tissue implant
Implantable cardioverter-defibrillator
Orthopedic implant
Prosthetic implant
Retinal implant
Subdermal implant
Transdermal implant

Alternative
Alien implants
Extraocular implant
Implant (body modification)
Implant (thought insertion)
Microchip implant (animal) (human)
The Implant, a television episode of Seinfeld

See also
History of dental treatments
Implantation (disambiguation)
Osseointegration
Osseoincorporation